Cristina Roque (born November 6, 2001) is a Puerto Rican footballer who plays as a goalkeeper for the Florida State Seminoles and the Puerto Rico women's national team.

Early life
Roque was raised in Winter Garden, Florida. Her father was born in Santurce, San Juan, Puerto Rico.

Honours 
Florida State Seminoles
 NCAA Division I Women's Soccer Championship: 2021

Individual
 Atlantic Coast Conference Goalkeeper of the Year: 2022

References

External links
</ref>
</ref>
</ref>

2001 births
Living people
Women's association football goalkeepers
Puerto Rican women's footballers
Puerto Rico women's international footballers
American women's soccer players
Soccer players from Florida
Sportspeople from Orange County, Florida
People from Winter Garden, Florida
American sportspeople of Puerto Rican descent
Women's Premier Soccer League players
Florida State Seminoles women's soccer players